Edward "Eddie" Byrne (born 31 October 1951 in Dublin) was an Irish soccer player during the 1970s and 1980s.

Byrne played for Shamrock Rovers and Bohemians (two spells) amongst others during his career in the League of Ireland. He began his career at Rovers in 1969 and spent three seasons at Glenmalure Park before joining Bohs for one season. He drifted out of league football to play for Bluebell United before returning to Bohs the following season. He made five appearances for Bohs in European competition.

Byrne joined Philadelphia Fury with Fran O'Brien and Pat Byrne in March 1978.

He signed again for Rovers from Philadelphia Fury in August 1978  along with Bobby Tambling and went on to make 1 European appearance for the Hoops.

Along with Eamonn Gregg he had a short spell at VfB Lübeck in Germany during the 1980–81 season.

Sources
 The Hoops by Paul Doolan and Robert Goggins

References 

Republic of Ireland association footballers
Association football forwards
League of Ireland players
League of Ireland XI players
Shamrock Rovers F.C. players
Bohemian F.C. players
Philadelphia Fury (1978–1980) players
VfB Lübeck players
Shelbourne F.C. players
Athlone Town A.F.C. players
Living people
1951 births
North American Soccer League (1968–1984) players
Bluebell United F.C. players